Muhammad Mustafa Jauhar (10 May 1895 – 24 October 1985) was a Pakistani scholar, religious leader, public speaker, poet and philosopher.

Biography
Jauhar was born in Bihar, India. He was the eldest son of Hakeem Muhammad Muslim, who used to run his clinic in Bhagalpur during 1910, where Jauhar studied in an English School. Later he gained admission to Sultanul Madaris, and completed his education from Sultanul Madaris Lucknow in 1923.

Madrassa Abbasia (Patna, British India) 

Madrassa Abbasia was inaugurated in 1923 by Muhammad Baqir. Jauhar was appointed as its first Naib Mudarris-e-Alla in August 1925. He became Mudarris-e-Alla of the madrassa in January 1926. He called Abul Hassan to Patna and appointed him as the Naib Mudarris-e- Alla in the Madrassa.

English
Jauhar had a good command of the English language. Once, when he was afflicted with an itching skin disease, he felt that he could not remain ritually pure, so he restrained himself from studying the Quran and other religious books for some time. Instead he decided to read an English translation of Alif Laila. By the time he recovered from the disease he had already finished the book and strengthened his expertise in English.

Literary work

Study was the essence of Jauhari's life. He was considered an authority on Uloom-e-Falsafa o mantaq & Sufi metaphysics. He wrote many books, including:

 Tauheed o adal Nahj al-Balagha ki raushani main
 Aqaid-e-Jaafria
 Asool-e-Jaafria
 Saboot-e-Khuda
 Janab kay tareekhi khutba fidak ka tarjuma which is included in Seerat-e-Fatima Zahra by Agha Sultan Ahmad Mirza
 Translation of Al-Ghadir (Volume 1)

See also
 Talib Jauhari

References

External links
 Khursheed-e-Khawar by Hujjat-ul-Islam Maulana Saeed Akhtar from India... A biography of notable Ulema of India and Pakistan
 Allama Talib Jauhari Page on Facebook
 Unity and justice of God Book by Maulana Muhammad Mustafa Jauhar
 'Truth Wisdom and Justice behind Oneness of Allah' by Maulana Jauhar
 Maulana Muhammad Mustafa Jauhar Majalis
 Maulana Mushammad Mustafa Jauhar Lectures
 Ahsan-al-hadees by Allama Talib Jauhari 
 Fehm-ul-Quran series by Allama Talib Jauhari on PTV
 Allama Talib Jauhari 496 Lectures/Majalis
 Allama Talib Jauhari Majalis

1895 births
1985 deaths
People from Bihar
Pakistani people of Bihari descent
Pakistani Shia Muslims
Shia scholars of Islam
Islamic philosophers
Pakistani scholars
Urdu-language poets from Pakistan
Indian Islamic religious leaders
20th-century poets
20th-century Pakistani philosophers